James Elmer Gibbs (August 19, 1913 – May 31, 2010) was an American professional basketball player. He played for the Toledo Jeeps and Flint Dow A.C.'s in the National Basketball League (NBL) and averaged 5.5 points per game. Gibbs also served as a player-coach for the Tulsa Ranchers in the Professional Basketball League of America during 1947–48.

He was the older brother of NBL player John Gibbs.

References

1913 births
2010 deaths
American men's basketball players
United States Navy personnel of World War II
Basketball players from Missouri
Centers (basketball)
Central Missouri Mules basketball players
Flint Dow A.C.'s players
Forwards (basketball)
High school basketball coaches in the United States
People from Wayne County, Missouri
Player-coaches
Professional Basketball League of America players
Toledo Jeeps players